Irene Bianucci (December 16, 1903November 20, 1988) was an Italian-born American painter, who participated in the art projects for the New Deal's Section of Painting and Sculpture creating the post office mural for Mount Carroll, Illinois, as well as murals for some of Chicago's elementary schools.

Early life
Irene Bianucci was born on December 16, 1903 in Lucca, Tuscany, Italy to Assunta (née Cataldi) and Amadeo Bianucci. When she was six years old, her family immigrated to the United States, first settling in Farmer City, Illinois, before moving to the nearby city of Clinton. After graduating from Clinton High School in 1922, Bianucci went on to study at Millikin University in Decatur, Illinois. In 1924, Bianucci won the Minnie Bachman Mueller prize from Millikin for exceptional ability in execution of a mural entitled "Music". She began entering her work in county fairs winning two first place ribbons at the Illinois State Fair in 1926 for a still life and a painting of animals. Graduating from Miliken after completion of her studies, Bianucci continued her training, enrolling at the Chicago Art Institute, later that same year.

Returning to the fair competition in 1927, Bianucci won three blue ribbons and five red ribbons for her paintings at the state fair. In 1930, she was awarded the Union League Club of Chicago Art Prize for her painting, "Little Russian Girl" and then won The Louis Comfort Tiffany Foundation Fellowship to continue her studies in New York. Bianucci's painting, "La Pensierosa", was selected to be part of the Art Institute of Chicago’s 34th Annual Exhibition in 1930.  The following year, she participated in a show of works by the present and former students of George Raab at the Decatur Art Institute. Bianucci's portraiture was singled out for its eye-catching qualities.

Career
Beginning in 1931, Bianucci worked as a professional portraitist. Her studio was located on Dearborn Street and she participated in gallery showings in 1935 at the Chicago Art Institute and Tower Town Galleries. Glowing reviews of her works, such as "In the Storm", "Rain", and "Young Girl", appeared regularly in Eleanor Jewett's column on the arts in The Chicago Tribune, in 1940.

Bianucci joined the Works Progress Administration (WPA) artists of Illinois, receiving commissions to paint murals in Chicago at the Clara Barton Elementary School and the Martin A. Ryerson Elementary School. Her two murals at Ryerson, Discovery of America and Landing of Columbus were painted in 1940. Her mural at Clara Barton School was later destroyed. In 1941, Bianucci won the commission to paint the post office mural at Mount Carroll, Illinois. The mural, entitled Rural Scene–Wakarusa Valley, was an oil on canvas farm scene, which was restored in the late 1990s. When the federal artist's program ended in 1943, Bianucci worked as an illustrator and designer for the Container Corporation of America throughout World War II.

Bianucci married fellow artist, Roy Robert Soravia, who was involved in the Op art movement and directed the Parnassus Gallery in Chicago. In 1949, the couple moved to Leucadia, Encinitas, California. Both continued to paint and showed their works at such galleries as Mandel Brother's Art Gallery of Chicago.

Death and legacy
Soravia died on November 20, 1988 in Encinitas, San Diego County, California.

References

Citations

Bibliography

 

 
 
 
 
 
 
 
 
 
 

1903 births
1988 deaths
People from Clinton, Illinois
Millikin University alumni
Artists from Illinois
Federal Art Project artists
Section of Painting and Sculpture artists
20th-century American women artists
Italian emigrants to the United States